

Q 

 
 
 
 
 
 
 
 
 
 
 
 
 
 1297 Quadea
 
 
 
 
 
 
 
 50000 Quaoar
 
 
 
 
 
 
 
 
 
 
 1239 Queteleta
 1915 Quetzálcoatl
 
 
 
 
 
 
 
 
 
 
 755 Quintilla

See also 
 List of minor planet discoverers
 List of observatory codes

References 
 

Lists of minor planets by name